Events from the year 1784 in France

Incumbents
 Monarch – Louis XVI

Events

Arts and culture

Opera
 18 September – Dardanus, opera by Antonio Sacchini, was first performed at Versailles

Theatre 
 Le Bon Père, comedy by Jean-Pierre Claris de Florian, first performed by the Comédie Italienne in Paris in 1784

Births

 6 October – Charles Dupin, mathematician (died 1873)

Deaths
 29 January – Abbé François Blanchet, intellectual (born 1707)
 15 February – Pierre Macquer, chemist (born 1718)
 7 March – Jean-Baptiste-Louis-Théodore de Tschudi, botanist and poet (born 1734)
 30 March – Emmanuel de Croÿ-Solre, military officer (born 1718)
 30 July – Denis Diderot, philosopher (born 1713)
 1 September – Jean-François Séguier, botanist and astronomer (born 1703)
 1 November – Jean-Jacques Lefranc, Marquis de Pompignan, man of letters and erudition (born 1709)

See also

References

1780s in France